Aquarius is an album by American jazz flautist Nicole Mitchell, which was recorded in 2012 and released on Delmark. It was the debut of her ensemble Ice Crystal, a quartet with vibraphonist Jason Adasiewicz, bassist Josh Abrams and drummer Frank Rosaly. The last piece is a tribute to saxophonist Fred Anderson.

Reception

The Down Beat review by John Corbett says "Mitchell is a stellar composer, and while her work for a larger ensemble has revealed much about her musical personality, it’s nice to hear how she manages things in a cozier setting, where the written and the improvised fuse quite completely."

In a review for JazzTimes Michael J. West notes that "Mitchell spends much time demonstrating her flute tone at its brightest, with high pitches and enthusiastic swoops, while Adasiewicz takes the opposite approach, sounding dark and dim with his low, limited notes. Even so, the execution is masterful."

The Point of Departure review by Troy Collins says "Devoid of overarching conceptual themes, the ensuing compositions convey a fluid, freewheeling sensibility. Underscored by Abrams and Rosaly’s discerning accompaniment, the scintillating rapport between Mitchell and Adasiewicz conjures intimations of such legendary partnerships as Eric Dolphy and Bobby Hutcherson, or Marion Brown and Gunter Hampel."

Track listing
All compositions by Nicole Mitchell
 "Aqua Blue" – 4:04
 "Today, Today" – 8:07
 "Yearning" – 6:43
 "Aquarius" – 8:02
 "Above the Sky" – 6:48
 "Diga, Diga" – 4:26
 "Adaptability" – 8:38
 "Expectation" – 8:00
 "Sunday Afternoon" – 9:38
 "Fred Anderson" – 4:10

Personnel
Nicole Mitchell - flute
Jason Adasiewicz – vibes 
Josh Abrams – bass
Frank Rosaly – drums
Calvin Gantt – spoken word on 10

References

2013 albums
Nicole Mitchell (musician) albums
Delmark Records albums